Visa requirements for Iranian citizens are administrative entry restrictions imposed on citizens of Iran by the authorities of other states.
 
As of January 2023, Iranian citizens had visa free, visa on arrival or eVisa access to 44 countries and territories, ranking the Iranian passport 97th in terms of travel freedom (tied with passports from Eritrea and South Sudan) according to the Henley Passport Index.


Visa requirements map

2020 travel restrictions

Due to the COVID-19 pandemic, several countries have imposed temporary travel restrictions on Iranian citizens or persons arriving from Iran.

 — visitors who have been in, transited through, or are nationals of several designated "high-risk countries" (including Iran) are not allowed to enter.

Visa requirements

Dependent, Disputed, or Restricted territories
Unrecognized or partially recognized countries

Dependent and autonomous territories

See also 

 Visa policy of Iran
 Iranian passport
 Foreign relations of Iran
 List of nationalities forbidden at border

References and Notes
References

Notes

Iran
Foreign relations of Iran